Tom Lollar is an American ceramist.  He attended Western Michigan University and earned his B.F.A. in Sculpture and Ceramics in 1973 and his M.A. in Ceramics and Art History in 1979.

Tom Lollar hand builds clay murals which depict architectural and geographical themes. Subjects include landmarks in both frontal bas-relief and aerial views. The unique surface color results from applying copper, bronze and platinum metallic paints and glazes.

Tom Lollar is currently the head of the Ceramics and Sculpture Department at Columbia University.

Since 1988, he has been the Director of Visual Arts at the Lincoln Center.

He is a trustee of the International Print Center New York.

He began teaching ceramics and sculpture in 1975 and is currently on the faculty of Teachers College, Columbia University.  He previously taught at Parsons School of Design in New York City.

Featured exhibitions
Tiffany & Co. NY 
Columbia University
Cooper-Hewitt, National Design Museum
Museum of Arts & Design
The Karlin Collection in Boston
American Craft Museum
Tokyo's Century Plaza Hotel 
Cleveland University-College of Urban Affairs 
Cleveland State University

Awards
Visiting scholar at the American Academy in Rome
Fellowship at the Salzburg Seminar
Fellowship at Jugendstil Design in Austria
Waldo-Sangren Award for Contemporary Ceramics in England.

References

American ceramists
21st-century ceramists
20th-century ceramists
Sculptors from Michigan
Western Michigan University alumni
Living people
1951 births
20th-century American sculptors
20th-century American male artists
American male sculptors
Teachers College, Columbia University faculty